The halogen dance rearrangement is an organic reaction in which a halogen substituent moves to a new position on an aromatic ring system. The reaction belongs to a class of organic reactions called 1,2-rearrangements. The original halogen dance is the base-catalysed rearrangement of 1,2,4-tribromobenzene to 1,3,5-tribromobenzene in liquid ammonia with the aniline/potassium base system. The intermediate in this reaction is an aryl carbanion. The halogen dance concept can be extended from benzene derivatives to other aromatic systems as well, for instance furan and thiophene
compounds.

The halogen dance rearrangement of iodooxazoles was studied by the Stambuli Group.

References

General references 
Participation of oligochlorobenzenes in the base-catalyzed halogen dance Martin H. Mach, Joseph F. Bunnett; J. Org. Chem.; 1980; 45(23); 4660-4666.

Rearrangement reactions